7-Dehydrocholesterol (7-DHC) is a zoosterol that functions in the serum as a cholesterol precursor, and is photochemically converted to vitamin D3 in the skin, therefore functioning as provitamin-D3. The presence of this compound in human skin enables humans to manufacture vitamin D3 (cholecalciferol) from ultraviolet UV-B rays in the sun light, via previtamin D3, an intermediate isomer. It is also found in the milk of several mammalian species. Lanolin, a waxy substance that is naturally secreted by wool-bearing mammals, contains 7-DHC which is converted into vitamin D by sunlight and then ingested during grooming as a nutrient. In insects it is a precursor for the hormone ecdysone, required for reaching adulthood. It was discovered by Nobel-laureate organic chemist Adolf Windaus.

Biosynthesis
It is synthesized from lathosterol by the enzyme lathosterol oxidase (lathosterol 5-desaturase).  This is the next-to-last step of cholesterol biosynthesis.  Defective synthesis results in the human inherited disorder lathosterolosis resembling Smith–Lemli–Opitz syndrome.  Mice where this gene has been deleted lose the ability to increase vitamin D3 in the blood following UV exposure of the skin.

Location 
The skin consists of two primary layers: an inner layer, the dermis, comprising largely connective tissue, and an outer, thinner epidermis. The thickness of the epidermis ranges from 0.08 mm to greater than 0.6 mm (from 0.003 to 0.024 inches). The epidermis comprises five strata; from outer to inner, they are the stratum corneum, stratum lucidum, stratum granulosum, stratum spinosum, and stratum basale. The highest concentrations of 7-dehydrocholesterol are found in the epidermal layer of skin—specifically in the stratum basale and stratum spinosum. The production of pre-vitamin D3 is, therefore, greatest in these two layers.

Radiation
Synthesis of pre-vitamin D3 in the skin involves UVB radiation, which effectively penetrates only the epidermal layers of skin. 7-Dehydrocholesterol absorbs UV light most effectively at wavelengths between 295 and 300 nm and, thus, the production of vitamin D3 will occur primarily at those wavelengths. The two most important factors that govern the generation of pre-vitamin D3 are the quantity (intensity) and quality (appropriate wavelength) of the UVB irradiation reaching the 7-dehydrocholesterol deep in the stratum basale and stratum spinosum. Light-emitting diodes (LEDs) can be used to produce the radiation.

Another important consideration is the quantity of 7-dehydrocholesterol present in the skin. Under normal circumstances, ample quantities of 7-dehydrocholesterol (about 25–50 μg/cm2 of skin) are available in the stratum spinosum and stratum basale of human skin to meet the body's vitamin D requirements. 7-DHC insufficiency has been proposed as an alternate cause for Vitamin D deficiency.

Sources 
7-DHC can be produced by animals and plants via different pathways. It is not produced by fungi in significant amounts. It is made by some algae, but the pathway is poorly understood. It can also be produced by some bacteria.

Industrially, 7-DHC generally comes from lanolin, and is used to produce vitamin D3 by UV exposure. Lichen is used in vegan supplements.

Interactive pathway map

See also 
 Vitamin D
 Smith–Lemli–Opitz syndrome
 7-Dehydrocholesterol reductase

References 

Cholestanes
Sterols
Nutrition
Vitamin D